The United States Merchant Marine Academy Regimental Band, designated as "George M. Cohan's Own", is a United States military band and college marching band that currently serves as the official marching band of the United States Merchant Marine Academy. The USMMA is the only service academy outside of the six senior military colleges, to maintain a cadet-staffed band for musical purposes. The band, unlike other musical units of service academies, is a co-located full-time ensemble. The band mainly provides ceremonial support for protocol ceremonies and athletic events. It performs A Life on the Ocean Wave, the official march of the USMMA and the Star Spangled Banner at all ceremonies. The modern band succeeded a full-time band that was deactivated following World War II. The band is currently led by Lieutenant Commander Bob Nixon, succeeding Captain Kenneth Force who served with the band from 1971 – 2016.

The band was given the designation "George M. Cohan's Own" in 1999 by two of composer George M. Cohan's grandchildren, in recognition of the band's assistance in saving Cohan's former residence from demolition.

The 35-piece band maintains the following ensembles at its disposal:

Marching Band
Concert Band
Brass Quintet
Fanfare Team

Performances

In recent years, the band has represented the academy at all the inaugural parades for Barack Obama and Donald Trump, both occasions it was led by Captain Kenneth Force. The band plays an essential in the "Ceremony of Beating Retreat", which is a military tattoo based in British roots. It takes place during the USMMA parent weekend, and usually has parents of midshipmen in attendance. The band traditionally performs at the end of the National Memorial Day Parade in May. The band has also historically taken part in civil parades/events, including the Macy's Thanksgiving Day Parade, the Cotton Bowl Classic Halftime Show, the Miss America Pageant, and events on Cow Harbor Day.

Characteristics
Like its counterparts at the Valley Forge Military Academy and College in Wayne, Pennsylvania, it uses the same military format as the British Royal Marines Band Service. An example of this similarity is seen the most in the use of tenor drums and its location to the front of the formation. The uniform consists of a combination peaked cap with a gold chinstrap, a black tunic, and white trousers, alongside white gloves and black shoes.

References

External links 

Sounds of the USMMA Band
The USMMA Band at the Second inaugural parade of Barack Obama
The USMMA Band at the Inaugural parade of Donald Trump
The USMMA Band during the morning march in of the colors

American military bands
Wind bands
Military units and formations of the United States
College marching bands in the United States
Musical groups from New York (state)
United States Merchant Marine
Military academy bands